The Four Mounds site is a historic site located in Dubuque, Iowa, United States. It is made up of a row of four conical burial mounds on a blufftop that overlooks the Mississippi River. They are prehistoric in their origin. The site was individually listed on the National Register of Historic Places in 2000. It was included as a contributing property in the Four Mounds Estate Historic District in 2002.

References

Mounds in Iowa
Native American history of Iowa
Protected areas on the Mississippi River
Protected areas of Dubuque County, Iowa
National Register of Historic Places in Dubuque, Iowa
Archaeological sites on the National Register of Historic Places in Iowa
Individually listed contributing properties to historic districts on the National Register in Iowa